Maria Aleksandrovna Kharenkova (born 29 October 1998) is a retired Russian-Georgian artistic gymnast. She is the 2014 European champion on the balance beam.

Junior career

2011 
In April, Kharenkova competed at the Russian Championships in Penza, Russia in the CMS division. She placed sixth in the all-around competition with a total score of 106.000. In event finals, she placed fifth on uneven bars and took gold on floor.

2012 
In March, Kharenkova competed at the 2012 Pacific Rim Championships in Everett, United States. She placed 4th in the all-around competition with a score of 52.950. In event finals, she placed fourth on vault scoring 13.550 and third both on balance beam scoring 14.025 and on floor scoring 13.950.

Later that month Kharenkova competed at City of Jesolo Trophy in Jesolo, Italy. She helped the Russian team finish in third place and individually she placed third with an all-around score of 55.650. In event finals, she placed first on floor with a score of 14.300.

In May, Kharenkova competed at the European Championships in Brussels, Belgium. She contributed scores of 14.100 on vault, 14.100 on balance beam and 14.366 on floor toward the Russian team's first-place finish. Individually, she finished sixth in the all-around competition (despite qualifying in first place) scoring 54.631. However, in event finals, she placed third on vault scoring 13.699, first on balance beam scoring 14.766 and also won gold on floor scoring 14.233.

In November, Kharenkova competed at the Elite Gym Massilia event in Marseille, France. She helped the Russian team finish in first place and individually she placed fourth in the all-around competition scoring 54.250. In event finals, she placed second on vault scoring 13.688 and first on floor scoring 14.550.

2013 
In July, together with teammates Maria Bondareva and Viktoria Kuzmina, Kharenkova competed at the 2013 European Youth Olympic Festival in Utrecht, Netherlands. She contributed an all-around score of 54.600 toward the Russian team's first-place finish. She won the all-around competition with a score of 54.950. In event finals, she placed seventh on balance beam scoring 13.100 and first on floor scoring 13.950.

In September, Kharenkova competed at the Japan Junior International in Yokohama, Japan. She placed seventh in the all-around competition with a score of 54.900.

Senior career

2014 

In March, Kharenkova competed at the 2014 Cottbus World Cup in Cottbus, Germany. She placed second on balance beam and third on floor.

In May, Kharenkova competed at the 2014 European Championships in Sofia, Bulgaria. In the team final, she contributed scores of 13.933 on vault, 14.566 on beam and 13.766 on floor toward the Russian team's third-place finish. She then went on to win the balance beam title, scoring 14.933.

In October, Kharenkova was selected to compete at the 2014 World Championships in Nanning, China alongside her teammates: Aliya Mustafina, Daria Spiridonova, Ekaterina Kramarenko, Tatiana Nabieva, Alla Sosnitskaya and Polina Fedorova. During qualifications, she fell on balance beam and didn't make the event final. In the team final, Kharenkova contributed scores of 15.033 on balance beam and 13.233 on floor toward the Russian team's third-place finish.

2015 

On March 4, 2015, Kharenkova became the all-around champion at the National Championships in Penza, Russia. She also took the team title, balance beam title, placed 4th in the uneven bars final, and placed third on floor.

In April, Kharenkova competed at the 2015 European Championships in Montpellier, France. She won the silver medal in the all-around with a score of 57.132, behind Giulia Steingruber, after qualifying in first place. She also qualified into the uneven bars, balance beam and floor exercise finals. A heavy favourite and top-ranked qualifier for the balance beam final, she ended up falling in her routine and placing 6th.

In October, Kharenkova competed at the 2015 World Championships in Glasgow, United Kingdom. In the team final, she contributed a score of 13.533 on balance beam toward Russia's 4th-place finish.

2016 
Kharenkova suffered an ankle injury, thus missing contending for a spot for the 2016 Rio Olympics team.

2017 
Since the 2017 season, Kharenkova has been coached by Larisa Pirogova. On August 23–27, Khranekova competed at the Russian Cup where she won gold on floor, silver in balance beam and bronze in the all-around behind Elena Eremina.

2019 
In 2019 Kharenkova officially switched nationalities, opting to compete for Georgia.

2020
Kharenkova competed at the Baku World Cup; during qualifications she finished eighth on balance beam and therefore qualified to the event finals.  However event finals were canceled due to the 2020 coronavirus outbreak in Azerbaijan.

Coaching career 
In early 2022 it was announced that Kharenkova had retired from competitive gymnastics.  She became the balance beam coach for the Russian junior national team.

Competitive history

International Scores

References

External links

 
 Gymnastics Results
 

1998 births
Living people
Russian female artistic gymnasts
Sportspeople from Rostov-on-Don
Medalists at the World Artistic Gymnastics Championships
Female artistic gymnasts from Georgia (country)
Georgian people of Russian descent
European champions in gymnastics